Dioptra Island is the conspicuous 290 m long in east-west direction and 45 m wide rocky island off the northwest extremity of Low Island in the South Shetland Islands, and separated from Beslen Island on the southeast by a passage narrowing to 21 m at points. Its surface area is 0.92 ha.

The feature is named after the classical surveying instrument dioptra, and in association with other names in the area deriving from the early development or use of geodetic instruments and methods.

Location
British mapping in 2009.

See also
 List of Antarctic and subantarctic islands

Maps

 South Shetland Islands: Smith and Low Islands. Scale 1:150000 topographic map No. 13677. British Antarctic Survey, 2009
 Antarctic Digital Database (ADD). Scale 1:250000 topographic map of Antarctica. Scientific Committee on Antarctic Research (SCAR). Since 1993, regularly upgraded and updated

Notes

References
 Bulgarian Antarctic Gazetteer. Antarctic Place-names Commission. (details in Bulgarian, basic data in English)

External links
 Dioptra Island. Adjusted Copernix satellite image

Islands of the South Shetland Islands
Bulgaria and the Antarctic